Government Zawlnuam College is a college in Zawlnuam, Mamit district of Mizoram. The college is affiliated to Mizoram University. The College has only around 60 students.

History
Zawlnuam College was established in 1986, pronvincialized in 2007. It got NAAC accreditation in 2016.

Departments
The college has the following departments:
Department of English
Department of History
Department of Education
Department of Political Science
Department of Economics
Department of Mizo

See also
Education in India
Education in Mizoram
Mizoram University
Literacy in India

References

External links
 

Universities and colleges in Mizoram
Colleges affiliated to Mizoram University